Cluster ballooning is a form of ballooning where a harness attaches a balloonist to a cluster of helium-inflated rubber balloons.

Unlike traditional hot-air balloons, where a single large balloon is equipped with vents enabling altitude control, cluster balloons are multiple, small, readily available and individually sealed balloons. To control flight, arrest a climb or initiate a descent, the pilot incrementally jettisons or deflates balloons. Ballast, e.g., bottled water, can also be jettisoned to facilitate ascent.

Notable flights and balloonists
The Swiss adventurer Auguste Piccard experimented with cluster balloon flight in Rochester, Minnesota in July 1937.

In September of the same year, inspired by Piccard, an American photographer for Paramount News used 32 weather balloons for a feature photography assignment near Old Orchard Beach in Maine. Suspended from the balloons by a parachute harness in order to take aerial film footage, his mooring rope broke and he was lifted approximately  into the air.

In the Lawnchair Larry flight, Larry Walters, without any prior ballooning experience, attached 43 helium-filled weather balloons to a lawn chair and lifted off in 1982. In defending against charges later filed against him by the FAA, he stated that he intended to rise just a few hundred feet (about 100 metres), but underestimated helium's lifting power, causing his tethering strap to break prematurely. Walters reportedly had planned to control his altitude by using a pellet gun to selectively pop some of the balloons. However, he was initially hesitant to shoot any balloons, as he was concerned about falling out due to a loss of stability. Reaching a high altitude and seeing no other way of getting down, he eventually shot several of the balloons, initiating his descent.

On May 4th 2002 high school student Sarah Morgan was lifted up by 30 weather balloons and flew for 20 miles before being rescued after the ropes holding her broke in high winds

John Ninomiya's flights made on May 28, 2006 have been featured on The Science Channel, The History Channel, TechTV, TLC, and MTV.

Larry Walters is estimated to have reached  in 1982. His record is not recognized, however, because he did not carry a proper altimeter. This is a pending world record being considered by Guinness Book of World Records.

Yoshikazu Suzuki departed from Lake Biwa in Japan on 23 November 1992 with 23 helium balloons. He was spotted by a Japanese coast guard aeroplane on 25 November 1992, located about 800 km offshore over the Pacific Ocean, at altitude between 2,500 and 4,000 m, and was never seen again.

In April 2008, in Brazil, Roman Catholic priest Adelir Antonio de Carli ascended with 1000 balloons. Ground observers lost track of him when he floated out above the ocean, and he was missing until part of his body was recovered by an offshore oil rig support vessel on 5 July 2008. Carli at one point reached an altitude of 6,000 metres (19,685 ft) before losing contact with authorities.

Just two months later, in June 2008, FAA licensed pilot Jonathan Trappe attached a cluster of balloons to his standard, unmodified office chair and flew it to an altitude of 14,783 feet (ca. 4,506 m). The flight reportedly lasted for four hours and covered 50 miles (80.5 km) before Trappe returned to earth, retired the chair, and returned it to his workplace. On May 28, 2010, Sky News reported on Trappe's crossing of the English Channel by cluster balloon. Trappe departed near Challock, England, crossed over the White Cliffs of Dover at St. Margarets Bay, and made landfall again over Dunkirk, France. Trappe then tracked inland, and landed safely in a farmer's cabbage patch. Three years later, Trappe attempted a trans-Atlantic crossing, but his journey stopped short when he was forced to land in Newfoundland.

On September 2, 2020, illusionist David Blaine reached  via 52 helium-filled balloons, suspended by harness attached to a cable routed through his sleeve to appear as if holding the balloons by one hand. He had all necessary licenses and permissions, carried an oxygen supply, ADS-B transponder, and remote control of ballast and balloon-popping squibs. The balloon rig was then remotely piloted by the ground team to a safe recovery.

Other applications
Smaller balloon clusters consisting of several toy balloons are sometimes used for creating flying light effects by using them as a carrier for lightsticks or other small light sources. They can be also used for other amateur scientific experiments, such as making aerial photographs or atmospheric measurements.

Such toy balloons, with or without helium filling, are more readily available than bigger balloons.

See also
 Gas balloon
 Hopper balloon
 Kent Couch
 The Red Balloon, 1956 film
 Danny Deckchair, 2003 film
 Up, 2009 film

References

External links

 ClusterBalloon.com, Jonathan Trappe's Cluster Balloon Site
 NYtimes.com, "Grab Your Lawn Chair. Float Away" by Thomas Vinciguerra The New York Times, July 13, 2008
 ClusterBalloon.com, Jonathan Trappe's 'Chairway to Heaven' flight
 ClusterBalloon.com, "Carl Fredricksen's Flying Armchair" Website

Balloons (aeronautics)